The Bundjalung people are a large Aboriginal nation, a federation of a number of groups of clans which occupy the land from Grafton on the Clarence river of northern New South Wales north to the town of Ipswich and the Beaudesert, in southern Queensland, and down around the other side of the Great Dividing Range and back to Grafton. In the north, Bundjalung Nation shares a border with Yuggera Nation and Barrunggam Nation; to the east the Tasman Sea (Pacific Ocean); to the south Gumbaynggirr (also known as Kumbainggar) Nation; and to the west it borders Ngarabal Nation.

In pre-colonial times, Bundjalung Nation encompassed some of the richest hunting and fishing grounds anywhere on the Australian continent. According to the oral traditions of the Bundjalung People, these areas were first settled by the Three Brothers and their descendants.

The names of the 15 tribal groups comprising the Bundjalung Nation are Arakwal, Banbai, Birbai, Galiabal, Gidabal, Gumbainggeri, Jigara, Jugambal, Jugumbir (Yugembeh), Jungai, Minjungbal, Ngacu, Ngamba, Nyangbal and Widjabal.

The 2007 Githabul Federal Court Native Title Determination which was lodged by Trevor Close a commercial lawyer now living in Perth cut the Bundjalung Nation apart can be viewed here.

To the best of knowledge the Bundjalung Nation Aboriginal people from the East Coast of Australia, the Far North Coast of New South Wales and South East Queensland area, are the only ones whose dream time stories talk about arriving in Australia from elsewhere. They came from the land "at the centre of the world" when a massive catastrophe destroyed it. There are also mobs in Perth region that hold a spiritual belief they are descendants of 'star people' or people from stars & solar system.

Bundjalung Nation Aboriginal people have lived on and visited Goanna Headland for at least 12,000 years. The Aboriginal tribes were not united anytime before the 18th century, with more than 20 main groups, known collectively as the 'Bundjalung Nation'. Certain deities and religious practices were specific to certain localities.

Goanna Headland is also significant as the site where the ancestors of the Bundjalung people arrived by sea and populated the surrounding country. This event is related through the legend of "The Three Brothers (Bundjalung Nation) ".

Europeans

European discovery

On 15 May 1770 the coast in the vicinity of Evans Head was first mapped and described by Lieutenant James Cook on the Royal Navy Bark . This was during the First voyage of James Cook to what became known as New Zealand and Australia. Cook did not land. On the next day Cook saw and named Cape Byron and Mount Warning (known to the Bundjalung Nation as Wollumbin). He named Mount Warning after encountering nearby offshore reefs.

Cook failed to notice the entrance to the Richmond River, but noted the presence of about 20 Bundjalung Nation Aboriginal people on what is now Seven Mile Beach, just to the south of Broken Head. Sir Joseph Banks also noted these people and remarked that they completely ignored the presence of HMS Endeavour. This would seem to indicate that HMS Endeavour was not the first ship that they had seen (Richmond River Historical Society {RRHS}, 1997).

On 20 August 1828 Captain Henry John Rous on the frigate  dropped anchor at Byron Bay. His mission was to discover a navigable river and safe anchorage site. Captain Rous subsequently named the river Richmond after his brother's best friend, Charles Gordon-Lennox, 5th Duke of Richmond.

European invasion

The beginning of white invasion into the Richmond River area was the result of early explorations into the region by red cedar cutters and farmers, who arrived in approximately 1842, after hearing stories from 'stray natives' of the great Wudgie-Wudgie (Red Cedar) in the Richmond river area to the north of the Clarence river. 
Red cedar getters, as obsessed by 'red gold' as those who later suffered 'gold fever', brooked no interference in their quest for the magnificent old trees.

To legally cut red cedar, cutters were required to obtain a cedar cutter's license from Grafton (& later Casino), issued by Commissioner Oliver Fry for the North Creek and Emigrant Creek scrubs in 1851, for 6 pounds. The license did not provide ownership to land, but did allow the cedar-getter to build a hut and cut cedar on unsettled land. Word rapidly spread about the wonderful red cedar timber which made small fortunes for the men of the Richmond River.

Timeline

See also
 Animal worship
 Australian frontier wars
 Australian megafauna
 Bandjalang language
 Bundjalung people
 Caledonian Confederacy
 Commercialization of traditional medicines
 Comparative linguistics
 Demiurge
 Dirawong
 Dreaming (spirituality)
 History wars
 Land rights
 Limes (Roman Empire)
 Lists of legendary creatures
 List of Australian place names of Aboriginal origin
 List of massacres of Indigenous Australians
 Living Tongues Institute for Endangered Languages
 Noongar
 Philology
 Three Sisters (Australia)
 The Three Sisters (Queensland)
 Yagan

References

External links
 Bundjalung
 Bundjalung and Anangu identity autonomy
 Bundjalung of Byron Bay (Arakwal) Indigenous Land Use Agreement (ILUA) 
 Langford, Ruby Ginibi. (1994). My Bundjalung People, University of Queensland Press, Queensland.
 Minjungbal Aboriginal Cultural Centre
 The Bundjalung Mapping Project

timeline